Mørk is a Norwegian or Danish surname. The name may refer to:
Edward Mørk (1888–1926), Norwegian trade unionist and politician
Erik Mørk (1925–1993), Danish film actor
Lene Mørk (born 1979), Danish badminton player
Nora Mørk (born 1991), Norwegian professional handball player
Ole Mørk (born 1948), Danish professional football player and manager
Torbjørn Mork (1928–1992), Norwegian physician and civil servant
Truls Mørk (born 1961), Norwegian cellist

See also
Mork (disambiguation)